Arbelodes kroonae is a moth in the family Cossidae. It is found in south-eastern Namibia, where it has been recorded from the Richtersberg Mountain Desert. The habitat consists of submontane and montane areas.

References

Natural History Museum Lepidoptera generic names catalog

Endemic fauna of Namibia
Moths described in 2007
Metarbelinae